ACWW  may refer to:
Animal Crossing: Wild World 
Associated Country Women of the World